Tennis Australia Limited is the governing body for Tennis in Australia. It is owned by Australian states and territories. The association organises national and international Tennis tournaments including the Australian Open, the Australian Open Series, Davis Cup, Fed Cup, ATP Cup and Australian Pro Tour. In addition, the association takes the responsibility to facilitate tennis at all levels from grassroots to elite development. Tennis Australia's state-based member associates carry out the promotion, management, and development of Tennis within Australia. As well as administer amateur tournaments and youth development programs.

Tennis Australia's headquarter is located in Melbourne, Australia. It administrators Tennis projects throughout Australia employing approximately 716 full-time staff. The association generates income from selling tickets of the tournaments, selling TV rights and through sponsorships from companies.

The organisation was formulated and incorporated in 1904. In 1904, it operated as the Lawn Tennis Association of Australasia. In 1926, the name was changed to the Lawn Tennis Association of Australia. Finally, in 1986, the name was changed to Tennis Australia (TA).

History of Tennis in Australia 

The exact origin of the games of tennis is not known. Many believe the ancient civilisations of Greece and Rome initiated racquet and ball games like the current tennis. While others argue France and England introduced tennis around 18th and 19th centuries. In 1875, a meeting was held in England regarding that determine a standardised set of rules for the sport of Lawn Tennis. In January 1880, Australia hosted its first tennis tournaments in the Melbourne Cricket Club. Tennis grew in popularity in the following 20 years amongst wealthy Australians. In 1904, Australia required a governing body for Tennis in Australia. The state representatives formed the Australasian Lawn Tennis Association for both Australian and New Zealand.

The purpose of the Lawn Tennis Association of Australasia in 1904 was to organise the Davis Cup and the Australasian Championships. In 1926, the association moved to Melbourne from Sydney and began to trade as the Lawn Tennis Association of Australia. It was managed by Sir Norman Brookes until 1955. As tennis grew in popularity around the world during the 1970s and 1980s, the association formed a company and was remanded Tennis Australia in 1986.

Major Tournaments Hosted by Tennis Australia

Australian Open 

The Australian Open, formerly known as the Happy Slam, is one of the major tennis tournaments hosted by Tennis Australia. Along with the US Open, French Open and Wimbledon, the Australian Open is classified as a Grand Slam. The Australian Open is held annually in Melbourne for about two weeks. The categories of the tournament include women's and men's singles; men's mixed doubles; Junior Championships; the exhibition and legends; and wheelchair events. In 2019, the Australian Open experienced record attendance of more than 780,000 fans. The Australian Open's attendance rate has increased by 13% from 2015. This is the highest increase among the four slams. This way the Australian Open Tournaments contribute to the hosting state's economy. The 2020 tournaments for example, created 1775 jobs  and generated AUD387.7 million worth of Real Gross State Product. The 2020 tournaments also distributed AUD71 million worth of prize money. The winners of the Australian Open are awarded with prize money of AUD4.1 million as well trophies with their name inscribed on it.

The first Australian Open was held in 1905 with only seventeen participants. By 1924, Australian Open was a national event and it was hosted by different states every year. Since 1972, the Australian Open has only been held in Melbourne, Victoria. Women tennis tournaments were only included in the Australian Open from 1922. From 1969, the Australian Open allowed all players and professionals to compete in the tournament.

The Australian Open Series 
The Australian Open Series tournaments are pro tournaments held prior to the start of Australian Open tournament. The Series’ tournaments include:

 Brisbane International
 The Brisbane International is part of the Association of Tennis Professionals (ATP) World Tour 250 series and the Women's Tennis Association (WTA) Premier tournaments. This international tournament is owned by Tennis Australia and is annually held in Queensland Tennis Centre prior to Australian Open.
 Sydney International
 Sydney International, part of ATP tour, is a tennis tournament played leading up to the Australian Open. Historically, colonial officials used the Sydney International tournaments to select players for the Davis Cup team. The Sydney International includes tournaments for both men and women.
 Hobart International
 The Hobart International is part of the WTA tour that is annually held at the Domain Tennis Centre. The tournament is for international female tennis players.
 Hopman Cup
The Hopman Cup was co-founded in 1989 by Paul McNamee, an Australian double's champion. The Hopman is named in the honour of Harry Hopman, one of Australia's outstanding tennis players. The Hopman Cup is an international mixed-gender team tennis event that is annually organised in Perth. The tournament is part of the ITF  and features players from eight different countries. The tournament was played since 1989 and paused in 2020. 
 World Tennis Challenge
 The World Tennis Challenge was launched in 2009. It replaced the Australian Men's Hardcourt Championship. The WTC is held in South Australia for over three nights. It aims to provide platform for players to prepare for the Grand Slam, the Australian Open. The WTC attracts over 14,000 spectators each year. The WTC is organised by Tennis Australian and supported by the South Australian Tourism Commission.

The ATP Cup 
The ATP Cup is men's team competition that is annually hosted in Australia by Tennis Australia. Players from 24 different countries participate in the ATP Cup. The tournaments are held in the NSW Tennis Centre at Sydney Olympic Park prior to the Australian Open. The total prize money of US$15 million is distributed to the winners. The players also win up to 750 singles and 250 doubles ATP ranking points.

The Davis Cup 
The Davis Cup is men's international Tennis Tournament organised annually by various countries. It owned and regulated by International Tennis Foundation and Kosmos Tennis Group. Tennis Australia frequently hosts the Davis Cup for Australia. It hosted 12 Davis Cup contest from 1946 to 2017. The 2017 Davis Cup held at the Kooyong Lawn Tennis Club was the most recent Davis Cup played in Australia.

Fed Cup / Billie Jean King Cup 
Like Davis Cup, Fed Cup is world's largest women's international team championship. The Fed Cup has 116 countries participating and top 12 countries compete in the finals. The tournaments run for over one week. In 2020, it was renamed as Billie Jean King Cup after the 10-time winning champion Billie Jean King. The most recent Fed Cup hosted by Tennis Australia was in 2019 in Perth, WA. The event considerably contributed to the state's economy. It attracted more than 3000 people to Perth who spent AUD4.5 million. Also, as the tournament was broadcast internationally, it highlighted the state's attractions to the international tourists. This would help boost WA's tourism markets in future.

The Australian Pro Tour 
The Australian Pro Tour includes Pro Tour events, Australian Money Tournaments and the Asia-Pacific Tennis League that run for 36 weeks every year. The participants receive 15,105 world ranking points and the finalists share US$111,500 in prize money. The tournaments provide opportunities for emerging tennis players to practice professional tennis as well as connect with international tennis professionals. The tournaments allow players to choose a wide range of categories including surfaces, venues, and circuits. The tournament also offers international participants an opportunity to explore the iconic areas Australia as the tournaments are played across the nation in regional and metropolitan arenas.

Famous Australian Tennis Players 

Rod Laver

Rodney George Laver, an Australian Tennis legend, and the only player in the history of tennis to hold the Grand Slam twice. Laver was born in the sunshine state of Australia and nicknamed ‘Rocket’ by his coach Harry Hopman who was a Davis Cup captain. At the age of 17, in 1956, Laver won the US Junior Championship tournament. In 1962, Laver became the only second player to win the Grand Slam and in 1969, he won the Grand Slam again. Rod Laver was ranked world number one tennis player for seven successive years from 1964 to 1970. Throughout his career, Laver won thirty-nine titles and had a winning record of about eighty percent. Laver retired from professional tennis in 1979 and was part of the International and Australian Tennis Halls of Fame between 1981 and 1993. In 2000, as a tribute to Rod Laver, the centre court in Melbourne Park was to be named after him; the Rod Laver Arena.

Evonne Goolagong Cawley

Evonne Goolagong Cawley, part of Wiradjuri Aboriginal tribe, held the title of women's world number one tennis player from 1971 to 1976. At the age of 13, Goolagong-Cawley moved to live with tennis coach Vic Edwards. In 1971, 20-year-old Goolagong-Cawley competed in Wimbledon final against Australian Tennis champion Margaret Court and won the Wimbledon title. In 1972, Evonne Goolagong Cawley was named Australian of the Year. Evonne continued to win every Australian state title and Australian singles title in 1974, 1975 and 1976 as well as more Wimbledon titles. Hence, an English Journalist nicknamed her as the ‘Sunshine Supergirl’. In 1991, Evonne Goolagong Cawley moved to Noosa and restored her connections with her Wiradjuri people and got involved with Aboriginal affairs. In 2018 she was appointed as a Companion of the Order of Australia.

Tennis Australia's Support for Players 
Tennis Australia (TA) is involved with the local governments to support tennis at grassroots. The local governments own 80 percent of tennis venues around Australia. Hence, TA recognises and supports the local governments involvement in organising tennis in local community, parklands and open spaces. Furthermore, TA and Local governments around Australia have developed four rules to ensure all of the tennis facilities meet the shared objective of the sport's governing body. The four rules are accountability, community benefit, sustainability and accessibility.

Types of Tennis Matches organised by Tennis Australia 

Singles

The tennis singles tournaments involve individual players competing against each other. Tennis Australia hosts various Tennis singles tournaments.

Doubles

The tennis doubles tournaments include pair of players on both sides of the net competing against each other. Both players move freely around their side of the court, between the double side-lines and baselines. Tennis Australia hosts men's doubles, women's doubles, and mixed doubles.

Inclusion and Diversity

Tennis Australia and its Member Associations are committed to embracing diversity. Tennis Australia provides an environment in which people of diverse backgrounds can participate and feel comfortable. It organises Tennis tournaments for Deaf & Hard of Hearing, Intellectual Disability or Autism, Blind & Low Vision, Wheelchair Tennis and more.

Moreover, as Tennis Australia aims to create a discrimination free environment, it has published a booked called ‘Tennis: Everybody Everywhere’. The booklet outlines the scenarios of discriminator language and behaviours as well as provide practical solutions to deal with participants from diverse backgrounds.

Furthermore, Tennis Australia along with its Member Associations supports the participation of Aboriginal and Torres Strait Islanders through funding and promoting Indigenous Tennis Program (ITP). The ITP organises programs that offer tennis coaching to the Indigenous communities. The ITP employs a holistic approach to support the Indigenous Australians become officials, coaches, and administrators. This ultimately ensures the interested participants have satisfactory and safe tennis experience. Moreover, Tennis Australia holds an annual National Indigenous Tennis Carnival at the Darwin International Tennis Centre in which participants of all potential aged 10–18 are able to get involved. The carnival aims to celebrates the culture, music, and food through Tennis.

Tennis Australia - Awards
The awards issued by Tennis Australia include the Newcombe Medal, Spirit of Tennis, Coaching Excellence – Performance, Coaching Excellence – Club, Coaching Excellence – Development, Junior Athlete of the Year, Most Outstanding Athlete with Disability, Volunteer Achievement Award, Most Outstanding 30+ Tennis Senior, Excellence in Officiating, Most Outstanding Tennis Club, Most Outstanding Australian Ranking Tournament, Most Outstanding Professional Tournament and Most Outstanding School.

Tennis Australia has been following a new nomination process since 2016. The award winners across the nations are automatically nominated for their equivalent national award. The selection panel then determines the finalists for each Tennis Australia award category.

The Newcombe Medal 
The Newcombe Medal is one of the many awards issued by Tennis Australia annually. It is named in honour of Australian Tennis legend John Newcombe. The Medal is awarded to Australia's most elite Tennis player and ambassador for Tennis. The award seeks to acknowledge the performances, achievements and contributions made by Tennis Australia's members. The nominees of the awards are selected by a panel appointed by Tennis Australia. The panel includes Australian Tennis champions and well-respected members of the Tennis community.

See also
Australia Davis Cup team
Australia Fed Cup team
Australia at the Hopman Cup

References

External links 

 

Australia
 
1904 establishments in Australia
Sports organizations established in 1904